Darram (also Romanized as Darrām, Darām, and Derām) is a village in Darram Rural District of the Central District of Tarom County, Zanjan province, Iran. At the 2006 National Census, its population was 1,554 in 409 households. The following census in 2011 counted 1,859 people in 518 households. The latest census in 2016 showed a population of 1,701 people in 520 households; it was the largest village in its rural district.

References 

Tarom County

Populated places in Zanjan Province

Populated places in Tarom County